Zhao Wendi (born 15 October 2001) is a Chinese footballer currently playing as a forward for Nantong Zhiyun.

Club career
Zhao Wendi would be promoted to the senior team of Nantong Zhiyun for the beginning of the 2021 China League One season. He would go on to make his debut in a league game on 25 April 2021 against Nanjing City in a 1-1 draw. He would go on to establish himself as a squad player within the team and helped the club gain promotion to the top tier at the end of the 2022 China League One season.

Career statistics
.

References

External links

2001 births
Living people
Sportspeople from Changsha
Footballers from Hunan
Chinese footballers
Association football forwards
China League One players
Shanghai Shenxin F.C. players
Nantong Zhiyun F.C. players